The garden city movement was a 20th century urban planning movement promoting satellite communities surrounding the central city and separated with greenbelts. These Garden Cities would contain proportionate areas of residences, industry, and agriculture. Ebenezer Howard first posited the idea in 1898 as a way to capture the primary benefits of the countryside and the city while avoiding the disadvantages presented by both. In the early 20th century, Letchworth, Brentham Garden Suburb and Welwyn Garden City were built in or near London according to Howard's concept and many other garden cities inspired by his model have since been built all over the world.

History

Conception

Inspired by the utopian novel Looking Backward by Edward Bellamy, and Henry George's work Progress and Poverty, Howard published the book : a Peaceful Path to Real Reform in 1898 (which was reissued in 1902 as Garden Cities of To-morrow). The garden city would be self-sufficient and when it reached full population, another would be developed nearby. Howard envisaged a cluster of several garden cities as satellites of a central city of 58,000 people, linked by road and rail.

This success provided him the support necessary to pursue the chance to bring his vision into reality. Howard believed that all people agreed the overcrowding and deterioration of cities was one of the troubling issues of their time. He quotes a number of respected thinkers and their disdain of cities. Howard's garden city concept combined the town and country in order to provide the working class an alternative to working on farms or in "crowded, unhealthy cities".

First developments
To build a garden city, Howard needed money to buy land. He decided to get funding from "gentlemen of responsible position and undoubted probity and honour". He founded the Garden City Association (later known as the Town and Country Planning Association or TCPA), which created First Garden City, Ltd. in 1899 to create the garden city of Letchworth. However, these donors would collect interest on their investment if the garden city generated profits through rents or, as Fishman calls the process, "philanthropic land speculation". Howard tried to include working class cooperative organisations, which included over two million members, but could not win their financial support. Because he had to rely only on the wealthy investors of First Garden City, Howard had to make concessions to his plan, such as eliminating the cooperative ownership scheme with no landlords, short-term rent increases, and hiring architects who did not agree with his rigid design plans.

In 1904, Raymond Unwin, a noted architect and town planner, and his partner Barry Parker, won the competition run by First Garden City Ltd. to plan Letchworth, an area 34 miles outside London. Unwin and Parker planned the town in the centre of the Letchworth estate with Howard's large agricultural greenbelt surrounding the town, and they shared Howard's notion that the working class deserved better and more affordable housing. However, the architects ignored Howard's symmetric design, instead replacing it with a more 'organic' design.

Letchworth slowly attracted more residents because it brought in manufacturers through low taxes, low rents and more space. Despite Howard's best efforts, the home prices in this garden city could not remain affordable for blue-collar workers to live in. The populations comprised mostly skilled middle class workers. After a decade, the First Garden City became profitable and started paying dividends to its investors. Although many viewed Letchworth as a success, it did not immediately inspire government investment into the next line of garden cities.

In reference to the lack of government support for garden cities, Frederic James Osborn, a colleague of Howard and his eventual successor at the Garden City Association, recalled him saying, "The only way to get anything done is to do it yourself." Likely in frustration, Howard bought land at Welwyn to house the second garden city in 1919. The purchase was at auction, with money Howard desperately and successfully borrowed from friends. The Welwyn Garden City Corporation was formed to oversee the construction. But Welwyn did not become self-sustaining because it was only 20 miles from London.

Even until the end of the 1930s, Letchworth and Welwyn remained as the only existing garden cities in the United Kingdom. However, the movement did succeed in emphasizing the need for urban planning policies that eventually led to the New Town movement.

Garden cities 

Howard organised the Garden City Association in 1899. Two garden cities were built using Howard's ideas: Letchworth Garden City and Welwyn Garden City, both in the county of Hertfordshire, England, United Kingdom. Howard's successor as chairman of the Garden City Association was Sir Frederic Osborn, who extended the movement to regional planning.

The concept was adopted again in the UK after World War II, when the New Towns Act spurred the development of many new communities based on Howard's egalitarian ideas.

The idea of the garden city was influential in other countries, including the United States. Examples include Residence Park in New Rochelle, New York; Woodbourne in Boston; Newport News, Virginia's Hilton Village; Pittsburgh's Chatham Village; Garden City, New York (parenthetically, the name "Garden City", as it applied to the Stewart-designed city on Long Island, incorporated in 1869, pre-dates that of the garden city movement, which was established some years later near the end of the nineteenth century); Sunnyside, Queens; Jackson Heights, Queens; Forest Hills Gardens, also in the borough of Queens, New York; Radburn, New Jersey; Greenbelt, Maryland; Buckingham in Arlington County, Virginia; the Lake Vista neighborhood in New Orleans; Norris, Tennessee; Baldwin Hills Village in Los Angeles; and the Cleveland suburbs of Parma and Shaker Heights.

Greendale, Wisconsin is one of three "greenbelt" towns planned beginning in 1935 under the direction of Rexford Guy Tugwell, head of the United States Resettlement Administration, under authority of the Emergency Relief Appropriation Act. The two other greenbelt towns are Greenbelt, Maryland (near Washington, D.C.), and Greenhills, Ohio (near Cincinnati). The greenbelt towns not only provided work and affordable housing, but also served as a laboratory for experiments in innovative urban planning.

In Canada, the Ontario towns of Don Mills (now incorporated into the City of Toronto) and Walkerville (now incorporated into the City of Windsor) are, in part, garden cities, as well as the Montreal suburb of Mount Royal. The historic Townsite of Powell River, British Columbia, and the Hydrostone district of Halifax, Nova Scotia, are recognized as National Historic Sites of Canada built upon the Garden City Movement. In Montreal, la Cité-jardin du Tricentenaire is a classic form of Garden City located near the Olympic Stadium. All streets are cul-de-sacs and are linked via pedestrian paths to the community park.

In Japan several towns were inspired by the Garden City movement in the early 1900s, including Den-en-chofu, Yamato Village, and Omiya Bonsai Village. As with many Garden Cities, despite goals of creating classless societies, each of these examples became increasingly exclusive and populated primarily by wealthy statesmen and celebrities.

In Peru, there is a long tradition in urban design that has been reintroduced in its architecture more recently. In 1966, the 'Residencial San Felipe' in Lima's district of Jesus Maria was built using the Garden City concept.

In São Paulo, Brazil, several neighbourhoods were planned as Garden Cities, such as Jardim América, Jardim Europa, Alto da Lapa, Alto de Pinheiros, Butantã, Interlagos, Jardim da Saúde and Cidade Jardim (Garden City in Portuguese). Goiânia, capital of Goiás state, and Maringá are also examples of Garden Cities.

In Argentina, an example is Ciudad Jardín Lomas del Palomar, declared by the influential Argentinian professor of engineering, Carlos María della Paolera, founder of "Día Mundial del Urbanismo" (World Urbanism Day), as the first Garden City in South America.

In Australia, the Dacey Garden Suburb (now Daceyville) was established in 1912 based on Garden City principles. The suburb of Colonel Light Gardens in Adelaide, South Australia was also designed according to Garden City principles. So too the town of Sunshine which is now a suburb of Melbourne in Victoria and the suburb of Lalor, also in Melbourne. The Peter Lalor Estate in Lalor takes its name from a leader of the Eureka Stockade and remains today in its original form. However it is under threat from developers and Whittlesea Council. Lalor:Peter Lalor Home Building Cooperative 1946-2012 Scollay, Moira.  Pre-dating these was the garden suburb of Haberfield in 1901 by Richard Stanton, organised on a vertical integrated model from land subdivision, mortgage financing, house and interior designs and site landscaping.

Garden city ideals were employed in the original town planning of Christchurch, New Zealand. Prior to the earthquakes of 2010 and 2011, the city infrastructure and homes were well integrated into green spaces. The rebuild blueprint rethought the garden city concept and how it would best suit the city. Greenbelts and urban greenspaces have been redesigned to incorporate more living spaces.

Garden City principles greatly influenced the design of colonial and post-colonial capitals during the early part of the 20th century. This is the case for New Delhi (designed as the new capital of British India after World War I), of Canberra (capital of Australia established in 1913) and of Quezon City (established in 1939, capital of the Philippines from 1948 to 1976). The garden city model was also applied to many colonial hill stations, such as Da Lat in Vietnam (est. 1907) and Ifrane in Morocco (est. 1929).

In Bhutan's capital city Thimphu the new plan, following the Principles of Intelligent Urbanism, is an organic response to the fragile ecology. Using sustainable concepts, it is a contemporary response to the garden city concept.

The Garden City movement also influenced the Scottish urbanist Sir Patrick Geddes in the planning of Tel Aviv, Israel, in the 1920s, during the British Mandate for Palestine. Geddes started his Tel Aviv plan in 1925 and submitted the final version in 1927, so all growth of this garden city during the 1930s was merely "based" on the Geddes Plan. Changes were inevitable.

The Garden City movement was even able to take root in South Africa, with the development of the suburbs of Pinelands and Edgemead in Cape Town as well as Durbanville near Cape Town.

In Italy, the INA-Casa plan – a national public housing plan from the 1950s and '60s – designed several suburbs according to Garden City principles: examples are found in many cities and towns of the country, such as the Isolotto suburb in Florence, Falchera in Turin, Harar in Milan, Cesate Villaggio in Cesate (part of the Metropolitan City of Milan), etc.

In Belgium the Garden City movement took roots in the 1920s. After the First World War, there was a huge need for new housing. Social housing associations were created, often linked to political movements. In Brussels, Antwerp and Ghent new extensions of the city were built. These houses are still very popular among residents and classified as historical heritage. In the former Czechoslovakia, all industrial cities founded or reconstructed by the Bata Shoes company (Zlín, Svit, Partizánske) were at least influenced by the conception of the Garden City.

The Epcot Center in Bay Lake, Florida, took some influence from Howard's Garden City concept while the park was still under construction.

Singapore, a tropical city has over time incorporated various facets of the Garden City concept in its town plans to try and make the country a unique City in a Garden. In the 1970s, the country started including concepts in its town plans to ensure that building codes and land use plans made adequate provisions for greenery and nature to become part of community development, thereby providing a great living environment. In 1996, the National Parks Board was given the mandate to spearhead the development and maintenance of greenery and bring the island's green spaces and parks to the community.

Criticisms
While garden cities were praised for being an alternative to overcrowded and industrial cities, along with greater sustainability, garden cities were often criticized for damaging the economy, being destructive of the beauty of nature, and being inconvenient. According to A. Trystan Edwards, garden cities engender desecration of the countryside by trying to recreate countryside suburbs that could spread on their own; however, this was not a possible feat due to the limited space that they had (except at their outermost edges).

More recently, the environmental movement's embrace of urban density has offered an "implicit critique" of the garden city movement. In this way the critique of the concept resembles critiques of other suburbanization models, though author Stephen Ward has argued that critics often do not adequately distinguish between true garden cities and more mundane dormitory city plans.

It is often referred to as an urban-design experiment which is typified by failure due to the laneways used as common entries and exits to the houses, thereby helping to ghettoise communities and encourage crime; it has ultimately triggered efforts to 'de-Radburn'-ize, or to partially demolish American-Radburn-designed public housing areas.

When interviewed in 1998, the architect responsible for introducing the design to public housing in New South Wales, Philip Cox, was reported to have admitted with regards to an American-Radburn-designed estate in the suburb of Villawood, "everything that could go wrong in a society went wrong," and "it became the centre of drugs, it became the centre of violence and, eventually, the police refused to go into it. It was hell."

Legacy
Contemporary town-planning charters like New Urbanism and Principles of Intelligent Urbanism originated with this movement. Today there are many garden cities in the world, but most of them have devolved to dormitory suburbs, which completely differ from what Howard aimed to create.

In 2007, the Town and Country Planning Association marked its 108th anniversary by calling for Garden City and Garden Suburb principles to be applied to the present New Towns and Eco-towns in the United Kingdom. The campaign continued in 2013 with the publication in March of that year of "Creating Garden Cities and Suburbs Today -  a guide for councils". Also in 2013, Lord Simon Wolfson announced that he would award the Wolfson Economics Prize for the best ideas on how to create a new garden city.

In 2014 The Letchworth Declaration was published which called for a body to accredit future garden cities in the UK. The declaration has a strong focus on the visible (architecture and layout) and the invisible (social, ownership and governance) architecture of a settlement. One result was the creation of the New Garden Cities Alliance as a community interest company.

New garden cities and towns
British Chancellor of the Exchequer George Osborne announced plans for a new garden city to be built at Ebbsfleet Valley, Kent, in early 2014, with a second also planned as an expansion of Bicester, Oxfordshire. The United Kingdom government announced further plans for garden towns in 2015, supporting both the development of new communities in North Essex and support for sustainable and environmentally-friendly town development in Didcot, Oxfordshire. A "Black Country Garden City" was announced in 2016 with plans to build 45,000 new homes in the West Midlands on brownfield sites.

On 2 January 2017, plans for new garden villages, each with between 1,500 and 10,000 homes, and garden towns each with more than 10,000 houses were announced by the government. These smaller projects have been proposed due to opposition of "urban sprawl" in the garden city projects, as well as such quick expansion to small communities. The first wave of villages to be approved by ministers are to be located in:

 Long Marston, Warwickshire
 Oxfordshire Cotswold, Oxfordshire
 Deenethorpe
 Culm, Devon
 Welborne, Hampshire
 West Carclaze, Cornwall
 Dunton Hills, Essex
 Spitalgate Heath, Lincolnshire
 Halsnead, Merseyside
 Longcross, Surrey
 Bailrigg, Lancashire
 Infinity Garden Village, Derbyshire
 St Cuthberts, Cumbria
 North Cheshire, Cheshire

The approved garden towns are to be located in:

 Aylesbury, Buckinghamshire
 Taunton, Somerset
 Harlow & Gilston, Essex-Hertfordshire

Diagrams

Diagrams from the 1898 edition

Diagrams from the 1922 edition

"Den-en Toshi (Garden City)" Tokyo: Hakubunkan, 1907

Garden suburbs
The concept of garden cities is to produce relatively economically independent cities with short commute times and the preservation of the countryside. Garden suburbs arguably do the opposite. Garden suburbs are built on the outskirts of large cities with no sections of industry. They are therefore dependent on reliable transport allowing workers to commute into the city. Lewis Mumford, one of Howard's disciples, explained the difference as "The Garden City, as Howard defined it, is not a suburb but the antithesis of a suburb: not a rural retreat, but a more integrated foundation for an effective urban life."

The planned garden suburb emerged in the late 19th century as a by-product of new types of transportation were embraced by a newly prosperous merchant class. The first garden villages were built by English estate owners, who wanted to relocate or rebuild villages on their lands. It was in these cases that architects first began designing small houses. Early examples include Harewood and Milton Abbas. Major innovations that defined early garden suburbs and subsequent suburban town planning include linking villa-like homes with landscaped public spaces and roads.

Despite the emergence of the garden suburb in England, the typology flowered in the second half of the 19th century in United States. There were generally two garden suburb typologies, the garden village and the garden enclave. The garden villages are spatially independent of the city but remain connected to the city by railroads, streetcars, and later automobiles. The villages often included shops and civic buildings. In contrast, garden enclaves are typically strictly residential and emphasize natural and private space, instead of public and community space. The urban form of the enclaves was often coordinated through the use of early land use controls typical of modern zoning, including controlled setbacks, landscaping, and materials.

Garden suburbs were not part of Howard's plan and were actually a hindrance to garden city planning—they were in fact almost the antithesis of Howard's plan, what he tried to prevent. The suburbanisation of London was an increasing problem which Howard attempted to solve with his garden city model, which attempted to end urban sprawl by the sheer inhibition of land speculation due to the land being held in trust, and the inclusion of agricultural areas on the city outskirts.

Raymond Unwin, one of Howard's early collaborators on the Letchworth Garden City project in 1907, became very influential in formalizing the garden city principles in the design of suburbs through his work Town Planning in Practice: An Introduction to the Art of Designing Cities and Suburbs (1909). The book strongly influenced the Housing and Town Planning Act of 1909, which provided municipalities the power to develop urban plans for new suburban communities.

Smaller developments were also inspired by the garden city philosophy and were modified to allow for residential "garden suburbs" without the commercial and industrial components of the garden city. They were built on the outskirts of cities, in rural settings. Some notable examples being, in London, Hampstead Garden Suburb, the Sutton Garden Suburb in Benhilton, Sutton, Pinner's Pinnerwood conversation area and the 'Exhibition Estate' in Gidea Park and, in Liverpool, Wavertree Garden Suburb. The Gidea Park estate in particular was built during two main periods of activity, 1911 and 1934. Both resulted in some good examples of domestic architecture, by such architects as Wells Coates and Berthold Lubetkin. Thanks to such strongly conservative local residents' associations as the Civic Society, both Hampstead and Gidea Park retain much of their original character.

Bournville Village Trust in Birmingham, UK, is an important residential development which was associated with the growth of 'Cadbury's Factory in a Garden'. Here garden city principles are a fundamental part of the Trust's activity. There are tight restrictions applying to the properties here such as no stonewall cladding.

Howard's influence reached as far as Mexico City, where architect José Luis Cuevas was influenced by the garden city concept in the design of two of the most iconic inner-city subdivisions, Colonia Hipódromo de la Condesa (1926) and Lomas de Chapultepec (1928-9):
In 1926, Colonia Hipódromo (a.k.a. Hipódromo de la Condesa), in what is now known as the Condesa area, including its iconic parks Parque México and Parque España
In 1928–29, Lomas de Chapultepec

The subdivisions were based on the principles of the garden city as promoted by Ebenezer Howard, including ample parks and other open spaces, park islands in the middle of "grand avenues", such as Avenida Amsterdam in colonia Hipódromo.
One unique example of a garden suburb is the Humberstone Garden Suburb in the United Kingdom by the Humberstone Anchor Tenants' Association in Leicestershire, and it is the only garden suburb ever to be built by the members of a workers' co-operative; it remains intact to the present. In 1887 the workers of the Anchor Shoe Company in Humberstone formed a workers' cooperative and built 97 houses.

American architects and partners, Walter Burley Griffin and Marion Mahony Griffin  were proponents of the movement and after their arrival in Australia to design the national capital Canberra, they produced a number of garden suburb estates, most notably at Eaglemont with the Glenard and Mount Eagle Estates and the Ranelagh and Milleara Estates in Victoria.

The idea of garden suburbs was implemented by the Jewish settlers in Mandate Palestine and later in Israel.

See also

 Charles Reade
 City Beautiful movement
 Garden buildings
 Greater city movements
 Greening
 Roof garden
 Utopian architecture

Related urban design concepts
 Ecological urbanism
 EPCOT (concept)
 European Urban Renaissance
 Green belt
 Green urbanism
 Principles of Intelligent Urbanism
 Soviet urban planning ideologies of the 1920s
 Subsistence Homesteads Division
 Transit Oriented Development
 Transition Towns
 Urban forest

Notes

References

Citations

Sources 

 Works cited
 .
 .
 .
 .

Bibliography 

 Bigon, Liora. "Garden Cities." in The Wiley Blackwell Encyclopedia of Urban and Regional Studies (2019) pp: 1-6.
 Bigon, Liora, and Y. Katz, eds. Garden Cities and Colonial Planning: Transnationality and Urban Ideas in Africa and Palestine (Manchester University Press, 2014). online review

 Clevenger, Samuel M., and David L. Andrews. "Regenerating the ‘Stock’ of the Empire: Biopower and Physical Culture in English Garden City Planning Discourse, 1898-1903." International Journal of the History of Sport (2021): 1-20.
 Freestone, Robert. "The garden city idea in Australia." Australian Geographical Studies 20.1 (1982): 24-48.

 Geertse, Michel. "The International Garden City campaign: transnational negotiations on town planning methods 1913-1926." Journal of Urban History 42.4 (2016): 733-752.

 Jones, Karen R. "'The Lungs of the City': Green Space, Public Health and Bodily Metaphor in the Landscape of Urban Park History." Environment and History 24.1 (2018): 39-58 online.

 Knight, Frances. "The Victorian city and the Christian imagination: from gothic city to garden city." Urban History 48.1 (2021): 37-53 online.
 Kolankiewicz, Victoria, David Nichols, and Robert Freestone. "The tribulations of Walter Burley Griffin’s final Australian plan: Milleara as ‘the garden city of the future’ 1925–1965." Planning Perspectives 34.5 (2019): 911-923; on Melbourne suburbs.
 Lewis, John. "Preserving and maintaining the concept of Letchworth Garden City." Planning perspectives 30.1 (2015): 153-163.

 Meacham, Standish. Regaining Paradise: Englishness and the Early Garden City Movement (1999).
 Miller, Mervyn. "Commemorating and celebrating Raymond Unwin (1863–1940)." Planning Perspectives 30.1 (2015): 129-140.
 Nikologianni, Anastasia, and Peter J. Larkham. "The Urban Future: Relating Garden City Ideas to the Climate Emergency." Land 11.2 (2022): 147+.

 Purdom, Charles Benjamin. The Garden City: a study in the development of a modern town (JM Dent & sons Limited, 1913), on Letchworth. online

 Reade, Charles C. "A defence of the Garden City movement." The Town Planning Review 4.3 (1913): 245-251, a primary source; online

 .
 Stern, Robert A. M., David Fishman, and Jacob Tilove, eds. Paradise planned: the garden suburb and the modern city (Monacelli Press, 2013).
 van Rooijen, Maurits. "Garden city versus green town: The case of Amsterdam 1910–1935." Planning Perspective 5.3 (1990): 285-293.
 Ward, Stephen. The garden city: Past, present and future (Routledge, 2005).

 Wilson, Matthew. "A new civic spirit for garden city-states: on the lifework of Sybella Gurney." Journal of Planning History 17.4 (2018): 320-344. online

External links
Sir Ebenezer Howard and the Garden City Movement Norman Lucey 1973
Patrick Barkham Britain's housing crisis: are garden cities the answer? 2 October 2014
Nature Meets Culture: Poland's Garden Cities

 
Planned cities
Sustainable urban planning
Political movements in the United Kingdom
Urban forestry
1898 introductions
Architecture related to utopias